This is a list of every work (novels, short stories, etc.) by American novelist Dean Koontz.

Series

Black Cat Mysteries / Mike Tucker Series

Moonlight Bay Series

Odd Thomas Series

Odd Thomas Graphic Novel Prequels

Frankenstein Series

Makani Trilogy

Jane Hawk Series

Nameless

Season One

Season Two

Standalone novels

Essays and introductions
 "Of Childhood" (Reflector, 1966)
 "Ibsen's Dream" (Reflector, 1966)
 Introduction to Great Escapes: New Designs for Home Theaters by Theo Kalomirakis (October 15, 2003). . 
 Foreword to Love Heels: Tales from Canine Companions for Independence (October 1, 2003)
 Foreword to A Rat Is a Pig Is a Dog Is a Boy: The Human Cost of the Animal Rights Movement by Wesley J. Smith (April, 2009)
Foreword to The Girl, the Gold Watch & Everything by John D. MacDonald (2014, Trade Paperback Edition)

Short fiction
(The stories up to "Where No One Fell" first appeared in "The Reflector", a magazine issued by Shippensburg University, Pa., when Koontz was a student)

 "This Fence" (1965)
 "The Kittens" (1965) (later revised [1966] as "Kittens") in Strange Highways
 "Of Childhood" (1965)
 "A Miracle is Anything" (1966)
 "Cloistered Walls" (1966)
 "Flesh" (1966)
 "For a Breath I Tarry" (1966)
 "Hey, Good Christian" (1966)
 "Holes" (1966)
 "It" (1966)
 "I've Met One" (1966)
 "Mold in the Jungle" (1966)
 "Sam: the Adventurous Exciting Well-traveled Man" (1966)
 "Some Disputed Barricade" (1966)
 "Something About This City" (1966)
 "The Rats Run" (1966)
 "The Standard Unusual" (1966)
 "Where No One Fell" (1967)
 "Soft Come the Dragons" (1967) rp in Soft Come the Dragons
 "To Behold the Sun" (1967) rp in Soft Come the Dragons
 "Little Goody Two-Shoes Chapter One" (1967; in "SF Opinion #4" (Dean Koontz fanzine))
 "Little Goody Two-Shoes Chapter Two" (1967; in "SF Opinion #5" (Dean Koontz fanzine))
 "Love 2005" (1968)
 "A Darkness in My Soul" (1968) rp in Soft Come the Dragons. Expanded into A Darkness in My Soul
 "The Psychedelic Children" (1968) rp in Soft Come the Dragons
 "The Twelfth Bed" (1968) rp in Soft Come the Dragons
 "Dreambird" (1968)
 "Glunk" (1969; in "SF Opinion #7" (Dean Koontz fanzine, special Vaughn Bode issue)); based on Bode's comic strip "Junkwaffel"
 "Little Goody Two-Shoes Chapter Three" (1969; in "SF Opinion #7" (Dean Koontz fanzine))
 "Whoop, the Dead Gerkle" (1969; in "SF Opinion #7" (Dean Koontz fanzine)
 "In the Shield" (1969) combined with "Where the Beast Runs" as Fear That Man
 "Temple of Sorrow" (1969)
 "Killerbot!" (1969) rp in Soft Come the Dragons as "A Season for Freedom".  Revised and re-issued in 1977. 
 "The Face in His Belly" Part One (1969)
 "Where the Beast Runs" (1969) combined with "In the Shield" as Fear That Man
 "Dragon In the Land" (1969) in Soft Come the Dragons
 "The Face in His Belly" Part Two (1969)
 "Muse" (1969) [a "Leonard Chris" story]
 "A Third Hand" (1970) rp in Soft Come the Dragons. Expanded as Starblood.
 "The Good Ship Lookoutworld" (1970)
 "Unseen Warriors" (1970)
 "The Mystery of His Flesh" (1970) expanded as Anti-Man
 "Beastchild" (1970) expanded as Beastchild
 "The Crimson Witch" (1970) slightly expanded as The Crimson Witch
 "Shambolain" (1970)
 "Nightmare Gang" (1970)
 "Emanations" (1970)
 "Bruno" (1971) [a Jake Ash story] revised rp in Strange Highways
 "The Terrible Weapon" (1972)
 "Cosmic Sin" (1972) [a Jake Ash story] 
 "Altarboy" (1972)
 "Ollie's Hands" (1972) {revised and re-issued in 1987} rp in Strange Highways
 "A Mouse in the Walls of the Global Village" (1972; in Again, Dangerous Visions; in the original Afterword, Koontz mentions having written Hung,"set in the hippie subculture of a small university", which tried to show that Marshall McLuhan's concept of the global village was "on the right track" and that "our world was already being compressed"; his novel, The Fall of the Dream Machine, and stories, 'A Dragon in the Land', and 'A Mouse..' were extrapolations of the concept.
 "Grayworld" (1973) expanded as The Long Sleep as by John Hill
 "The Sinless Child" (1973)
 "Wake Up To Thunder" (1973)
 "Terra Phobia" (1973)
 "The Undercity" (1973)
 "We Three" (1974) revised rp in Strange Highways
 "Night of the Storm" (1974) {re-issued as a graphic novel in 1976} revised in Strange Highways
 "Down in the Darkness" (1986) rp in Strange Highways
 "Weird World" (1986)
 "Snatcher" (1986) rp in Strange Highways
 "The Monitors of Providence {collaboration}" (1986)
 "The Black Pumpkin" (1986) rp in Strange Highways
 "The Interrogation" (1987)
 "Hardshell" (1987) revised rp in Strange Highways
 "Miss Attila the Hun" (1987) rp in Strange Highways
 "Twilight of the Dawn" (1987) rp in Strange Highways
 "Graveyard Highway" (1987)
 "Trapped" (1989) {re-issued as a graphic novel in 1992} rp in Strange Highways
 "Strange Highways" (1995) short story that appears in the collection Strange Highways
 "Santa's Twin" (1996)
 "Pinkie" (1998)
 "Black River" (2000)
 "Darkness Under the Sun" (2010)
 "The Moonlit Mind" (2011)
 "Odd Interlude" (2012)
 "Wilderness" (2013)
 "The Neighbor" (2014)
 "Odd Thomas: You Are Destined to Be Together Forever" (2014)
 "Last Light" (2015)
 "Final Hour" (2015)
 "Ricochet Joe" (2017)
 "The Bone Farm" (2018)
 "Troubled Times" (2018)
 "In the Heart of the Fire" (2019)
 "Photographing the Dead" (2019)
 "The Praying Mantis Bride" (2019)
 "Red Rain" (2019)
 "The Mercy of Snakes" (2019)
 "Memories of Tomorrow" (2019)
 "The Lost Soul of the City" (2021)
 "Gentle Is the Angel of Death" (2021)
 "Kaleidoscope" (2021)
 "Light Has Weight, but Darkness Does Not" (2021)
 "Corkscrew" (2021)
 "Zero In" (2021)

Non-fiction
 "How to Write Best Selling Fiction" (1981)
 "Writing Popular Fiction" (1972)
 "A Big Little Life: A Memoir of a Joyful Dog Named Trixie" (2009)

References

Bibliographies by writer
Bibliographies of American writers
Horror fiction bibliographies
Science fiction bibliographies